Hyŏngjesan are mountains which consist of Hyŏngsan (Pukhyŏngjesan) and Chesan (Namhyŏngjesan) in Ryongsong-guyok and Hyongjesan-guyok, Pyongyang, North Korea.

References

Mountains of North Korea
Geography of Pyongyang